UOW College Hong Kong (UOWCHK) is part of the global network of the University of Wollongong (UOW) in Australia, one of the world’s top 200 universities. Its heritage stems from the Community College of City University (CCCU), established in 2004 under the City University of Hong Kong (CityU), which has a long history of providing higher education to the Hong Kong community.

In 2014, CityU partnered with University of Wollongong (UOW) and the college was renamed to UOWCHK in 2020. The medium of instruction is mainly English with some courses supplemented by Cantonese.

History

Establishment 
After the discontinuation of fund by the University Grants Committee (UGC) for most of the associate degree Programmes of City University of Hong Kong in 2004, the Community College of City University was established to provide various associate degree Programmes.

Alliance With University of Wollongong
On 21 November 2014, The University of Wollongong (UOW) and CityU announced their partnership. The college was then renamed UOWCHK / CCCU and eventually in July 2020, the college was further renamed as UOW College Hong Kong.

UOWCHK receives full support of UOW with educational resources and commitment to develop and enhance student experience via opportunities for mobility and global exposure. UOW has launched top-up degrees in Hong Kong via UOWCHK.

Campuses
There are currently 2 campuses of UOWCHK including the Kowloon City Campus and the Telford Annex.

Kowloon City Campus
The Kowloon City campus has around 87,000 square feet of modern teaching spaces and informal student learning areas which are conveniently linked to public transport and nearby amenities.

Telford Annex
The Telford Annex is located in Telford Plaza, Kowloon Bay. It is close to MTR Kowloon Bay station which is directly connected to the Telford Plaza. The Telford Campus has specially designed facilities for teaching and learning. It has Lecture Theatres, Group Study Rooms as well as regular classrooms, on-site Computer Laboratories with printing services that are open to students at designated periods. Notebook computers are available for loan to students for their use on campus, while all students can stay connected on campus with wireless LAN.

All students attending classes at the Telford Campus have access to the Telford library, which provides easy access to textbooks, periodicals and library materials. Online facilities are available for connection to the electronic resources of the University of Wollongong Library

Programmes

Diploma In General Studies

Arts and Humanities 

Higher Diploma in Digital Communication Design
Associate of Arts in Applied Chinese Studies
Associate of Arts in Bilingual Communication Studies (English and Chinese)
Associate of Arts in Bilingual Communication Studies (French and English)
Associate of Arts in Bilingual Communication Studies (French and Chinese)
Associate of Arts in Bilingual Communication Studies (Japanese and Chinese)
Associate of Arts in Bilingual Communication Studies (Japanese and English)
Associate of Arts in Bilingual Communication Studies (Korean and Chinese)
Associate of Arts in Bilingual Communication Studies (Korean and English)
Associate of Arts in Bilingual Communication Studies (Spanish and English)
Associate of Arts in Bilingual Communication Studies (Spanish and Chinese)
Associate of Arts in Cultural Studies 
Associate of Arts in Japanese Studies
Associate of Arts in Digital Visual Design
Associate of Arts in English for Professional Communication
Associate of Arts in Translation & Interpretation
Bachelor of Arts (Honours) in Chinese Language, Literature and Communication
Bachelor of Arts (Honours) in Japanese Studies
Bachelor of Communication and Media (UOW Top-up)

Science and Technology 

Higher Diploma in Creative Media Production
Higher Diploma in Robotics Engineering
Higher Diploma in Application Systems Development
Higher Diploma in Computer Network and Systems Administration
Associate of Engineering
Associate of Science
Associate of Science in Airport Operations and Aviation Logistics
Associate of Science in Aviation and Pilot Studies
Associate of Science in Data Analytics and Management
Associate of Science in Creative and Interactive Media Production
Associate of Science in Environmental Studies
Associate of Science in Information Systems Development
Associate of Science in Network and Systems Administration
Bachelor of Aviation (Honours) in Operations and Management
Bachelor of Science (Honours) in Artificial Intelligence
Bachelor of Computer Science (UOW Top-up)

Business 

Associate of Business Administration in Accountancy
Associate of Business Administration in Financial Services
Associate of Business Administration in General Management
Associate of Business Administration in Global Logistics and Supply Chain Management
Associate of Business Administration in Human Resources Management
Associate of Business Administration in International Business Management
Associate of Business Administration in Marketing
Bachelor of Accounting (Honours)
Bachelor of Business Administration (Honours) in Finance
Bachelor of Banking and Financial Technology (Honours)
Bachelor of Marketing and Supply Chain Management (Honours)
Bachelor of Business (UOW-Top-up)

Social Sciences 

Associate of Social Science
Associate of Social Science in Applied Psychology
Associate of Social Science in Applied Social Studies (Guidance & Counseling/ International Studies/ Urban Studies)
Associate of Social Science in Event Management
Associate of Social Science in Legal Studies
Associate of Social Science in Leisure and Tourism Management
Associate of Social Science in Public Administration and Management
Associate of Social Science in Public Relations and Advertising
Associate of Social Science in Social Work
Bachelor of Social Science in Social Innovation

Student life
Students can enjoy the outpatient medical and dental plans of the College. Under the medical and dental scheme provided by the College, students can visit designated clinics for consultations and basic dental services at low charges.

In addition, the College actively supports its students in sports for the benefit of enhancing students’ campus life, promoting a healthy lifestyle, and providing a platform to build relationships and confidence. All students are entitled to use the sports facilities at Telford Recreation Club (Kowloon Bay) and Spotlight Recreation Club (Whampoa Gardens). Fitness Centers at Telford Recreation Club and Spotlight Recreation Club offer students a diverse range of group physical fitness classes such as Yoga, Boxing and Indoor Cycling led by professional instructors. Bookings of fitness classes and sports facilities like badminton courts and swimming pools at both clubs may be made via the College's Sports Facilities Online Booking System.

References

External links
 

Universities and colleges in Hong Kong
University of Wollongong
Community colleges